Ustiprača is a village in the municipality of Novo Goražde, Republika Srpska, Bosnia and Herzegovina. According to the 2013 census, the village has a population of 278.

Between 2004 and 2005, the village was the namesake of the municipality, which, after its name of Srpsko Goražde was declared unconstitutional, temporarily changed its name to Ustiprača.

Demographics

Ethnic composition

References 

Populated places in Novo Goražde